Christopher Lundy Campbell (born September 9, 1954) is an American wrestler.  He was a bronze medalist in Freestyle wrestling at the 1992 Summer Olympics in Barcelona. He won a gold medal at the 1981 World Wrestling Championships, and a Silver medal at the 1990 World Wrestling Championships. He is the oldest known United States' wrestler to medal in the Olympic Games. When he won his Olympic medal he was a month away from his 38th birthday.

While wrestling for the University of Iowa, Campbell was a three-time All-American and a two-time NCAA champion, winning titles in 1976 & ’77. His career record of 122-6-3 ranks sixth on Iowa’s all-time career winning percentage list.

Campbell is a vegetarian. He is a native of Westfield, New Jersey, and is a graduate of Westfield High School, University of Iowa, and Cornell Law School.

According to The Seattle Times, "He practices Zen and dabbles in poetry. He's a vegetarian who likes nothing better than tofu stroganoff. He leg-presses 700 pounds, meditates, and quotes everything from The Sermon On the Mount to The Teachings of Buddha".

References

External links

1954 births
Living people
Wrestlers at the 1992 Summer Olympics
American male sport wrestlers
Olympic bronze medalists for the United States in wrestling
People from Westfield, New Jersey
Sportspeople from Union County, New Jersey
Medalists at the 1992 Summer Olympics
Pan American Games medalists in wrestling
Pan American Games silver medalists for the United States
Westfield High School (New Jersey) alumni
Wrestlers at the 1991 Pan American Games
Medalists at the 1991 Pan American Games